James William Negrych (born March 2, 1985) is an American professional baseball infielder for the Chinatrust Brother Elephants of the Chinese Professional Baseball League (CPBL).

College
Negrych was a two-time All-American at the University of Pittsburgh (2005 and 2006). In 2005, he played collegiate summer baseball with the Harwich Mariners of the Cape Cod Baseball League. Negrych was drafted in the 6th round by the Pittsburgh Pirates in the 2006 draft. He was the first Pittsburgh Panthers player drafted by the Pittsburgh Pirates since Larry Lamonde in 1981 and Ken Macha in 1972.

Professional career

Pittsburgh Pirates
The Pittsburgh Pirates drafted Negrych out of the University of Pittsburgh in the 6th round of the 2006 MLB Draft. In 2008, Negrych was the Pirates minor league player of the year. In 2008, while playing for the Lynchburg Hillcats, he was a Carolina League Mid-Season All-Star and a Carolina League Post-Season All-Star. In 2010, while playing for the Altoona Curve and Indianapolis Indians, Negrych was named an Milb.com Organizational All-Star. In 2011, Negrych was traded to the Florida Marlins for catcher Carlos Paulino.

Florida Marlins
In 2011, Negrych was traded to the Florida Marlins for catcher Carlos Paulino. In 2011, he played for the Jacksonville Suns of the Southern League.

Washington Nationals
Negrych signed with the Washington Nationals on April 22, 2012. In 91 games with Triple-A Syracuse, Negrych hit .264/.357/.391 with 8 HR and 39 RBI.

Toronto Blue Jays
On November 20, 2012, the Toronto Blue Jays announced that they had signed Negrych to a minor league contract with an invitation to spring training. He was assigned to his hometown Buffalo Bisons. On April 18, Negrych hit for the cycle as the Bisons defeated the Syracuse Chiefs 27–9. In July 2013, Negrych was named the starter at second base in the Triple-A All-Star Game.

Philadelphia Phillies
On January 13, 2014, the Philadelphia Phillies signed Negrych to a minor league contract. According to the International League transactions page, he was released on March 23.

References

External links

1985 births
American expatriate baseball players in Taiwan
Baseball players from Buffalo, New York
Baseball second basemen
Baseball third basemen
Living people
Williamsport Crosscutters players
Hickory Crawdads players
Lynchburg Hillcats players
Altoona Curve players
Indianapolis Indians players
Jacksonville Suns players
Harrisburg Senators players
Syracuse Chiefs players
Lancaster Barnstormers players
Pittsburgh Panthers baseball players
Harwich Mariners players
Buffalo Bisons (minor league) players
Brother Elephants players